The Culver XPQ-15, also known as the XTD3C-1, was an American target drone developed by the Culver Aircraft Company late in World War II.

Design and development
The XPQ-15 was a low-wing monoplane of conventional design. It was powered by a Franklin O-405 opposed piston engine. Design work began in 1943.

Operational history
Four examples of the XPQ-15 were built for evaluation by the United States Army Air Forces in 1945; two additional aircraft were tested by the United States Navy as the XTD3C-1. No production contract was placed.

Variants 
XPQ-15
USAAF variant; four produced.
XTD3C-1
USN variant; two produced, BuNos 29665-29666.

Specifications (XPQ-15)

References
Citations

Bibliography

External links

 Photo of XPQ-15 model in Popular Science

PQ-15
1940s United States special-purpose aircraft
Single-engined tractor aircraft
Low-wing aircraft
Target drones of the United States
Aircraft first flown in 1945